Genrikh Genrikhovich Sretenski (born July 23, 1962) is convicted sex felon and a former Russian ice dancer who competed for the Soviet Union. With partner Natalia Annenko, Sretenski is the 1988 European silver medalist and three-time (1986, 1987, 1989) European bronze medalist. They placed fourth at the 1988 Winter Olympics and three times at the World Championships.

Early in his career, he competed with Olga Makarova (future wife of Stanislav Leonovich). They finished fifth at the 1981 NHK Trophy. He teamed up with Natalia Annenko in 1982. They were coached by Ludmila Pakhomova and Tatiana Tarasova.

After turning pro in 1989, Annenko and Sretenski skated with Stars on Ice for four seasons.

Sretenski coaches at The Gardens Ice House in Laurel, Maryland. In September 2012, Sretenski was arrested in Maryland on sexual offense charges filed in New York. According to his attorney, he denied the allegations. In January 2013, he pleaded guilty to a charge of endangering the welfare of a child and was given a one-year prison sentence that was conditionally discharged.

Competitive highlights 
(with Natalia Annenko)

References

External links 
 

Soviet male ice dancers
Russian male ice dancers
Olympic figure skaters of the Soviet Union
Figure skaters at the 1988 Winter Olympics
Living people
1962 births
Figure skaters from Moscow
European Figure Skating Championships medalists
Universiade medalists in figure skating
Universiade gold medalists for the Soviet Union
Competitors at the 1983 Winter Universiade